Egil Oddvar Larsen (23 September 1923 – 17 October 2009) was a Norwegian politician for the Labour Party.

From 1975 to 1991, Larsen was the mayor of Hamar. As such he played a role in the 1994 Winter Olympics. He had been a member of Hamar county council since 1959, and became deputy mayor in 1968.

He served as a deputy representative to the Norwegian Parliament from Hedmark during the term 1969–1973.

References

1923 births
Deputy members of the Storting
Labour Party (Norway) politicians
Mayors of places in Hedmark
Politicians from Hamar
2009 deaths